New Kensington Downtown Historic District, also known as the New Kensington Commercial and Residential Historic District, is a national historic district located at New Kensington, Westmoreland County, Pennsylvania. It encompasses 143 contributing buildings in the central business district and surrounding residential areas of New Kensington.  They were built between about 1891 and 1947, and includes a mix of residential, commercial, institutional, and industrial properties. They are in a variety of popular architectural styles including Art Deco, Beaux-Arts, and Colonial Revival. Notable buildings include the Mellon Bank Building (1900), PNC Bank (1914), Wear Ever Building (1914–1915), U.S. Post Office (1933), Ritz Theater (1921–1922), Datola Theater in 1942, Columbus Theater (1927), and White Castle Restaurant (c. 1921–1928).

It was added to the National Register of Historic Places in 1998.

References

External links

Historic districts on the National Register of Historic Places in Pennsylvania
Beaux-Arts architecture in Pennsylvania
Colonial Revival architecture in Pennsylvania
Historic districts in Westmoreland County, Pennsylvania
New Kensington, Pennsylvania
National Register of Historic Places in Westmoreland County, Pennsylvania